This is a list of deans of Grahamstown. The dean is the incumbent of Grahamstown Cathedral, Eastern Cape Province, South Africa. In addition, the dean has other duties and roles set out in the "Deed of Constitution and Statutes of the Chapter of the Cathedral of St Michael and St George, Grahamstown" which is an appendix to the acts of the Diocese of Grahamstown. The 20th and current dean is Andrew John Hunter, who was appointed in 2008.

List of deans

Notes and references 

Eastern Cape-related lists
Deans of Grahamstown